St. Ignatius of Loyola University (USIL) is a private university located in Lima, Peru, part of a group of educational institutions founded in 1995 by former Peruvian Vice President Raúl Diez Canseco, along with an institute and two schools. Its Undergraduate Programme consists of 8 schools and 33 careers, though it does have a Graduate Programme. USIL has a strong focus on entrepreneurship and hospitality management, consistent with its mission statement, which is "to shape competent entrepreneurial professionals who are socially responsible and capable of performing successfully, both domestically and internationally".

Campuses

Fernando Belaúnde Terry Campus 
The first campus is named after Fernando Belaúnde Terry, President of Peru from 1963 to 1968 and from 1980 to 1985. It is the campus that was first built upon the university's founding and has classroom capacity for about 4000 students. Besides classrooms its facilities include the following:
 Deans' and other administrative offices
 Laboratories
 Library
 Reading and research centres
 TV and radio studios
 Cafeteria
 Don Ignacio Restaurant (run by students from the Culinary Arts major)

Miguel Grau Seminario Campus 
The second campus is named after Miguel Grau Seminario, Peruvian naval hero from the War of the Pacific. It has eight floors of classrooms and also houses the Graduate Programme, offices of Junior Achievement Peru, and further administrative offices, a cafeteria, student centres and the university's book store. It is currently being expanded to encompass at least two more buildings to accommodate the increase of students in recent years.

Undergraduate Programme 
The university's Undergraduate Programme consists of 8 schools and 33 careers, with strong focuses on business, entrepreneurship, culinary arts and hospitality management, but featuring other programmes as well.

School of Arquitecture 
 Architecture, Urbanism and Territory

School of Business 
The School of Business is the oldest in USIL and has the most majors, with eight careers:
 Business
 Entrepreneurship and Business Development
 Economics
 Economics and Finance
 Economics and International Business
 Corporate Environmental Management
 International Business
 Marketing

School of Law 
 Law
 International Relations

School of Education 
 Initial Education
 Bilingual Intercultural Initial Education
 Bilingual Intercultural Primary Education

School of Hospitality Management, Tourism and Gastronomy 
The School of Hospitality Management, Tourism and Gastronomy focuses on hospitality management, tourism management, culinary arts, and gastronomy, and has its own building on USIL's first campus, called Hall E, housing specific facilities for the use of its students, such as mock hotel rooms, bars, kitchens. Hall E is also shared with the Culinary Arts School, which is a different programme, as well as Don Ignacio Restaurant

School of Engineering 
 Agroindustrial and Business Engineering
 Industrial and Commercial Engineering
 Systems Engineering and Information
 Civil Engineering
 Business Engineering
 Food Industrial Engineering
 Logistics and Transport Engineering
 Environmental Engineering
 Mechanical Engineering

School of Health 
 Health Management
 Nutrition and Diet

References